Guo jin min tui (国进民退) is an alleged phenomenon in the Chinese economy, meaning "the state enterprises advance, the private sectors retreat".

Despite being less profitable - the average return on equity is 4% - state-owned enterprises have easier access to funding than purely private enterprises. The government has encouraged state-owned enterprises to consolidate, favoured them in regulation, and awarded them contracts and subsidies; this crowds out other competitors, both domestic and foreign, undermining the economy.

This contrasts with an earlier phase of economic liberalisation in China, where the private sector was seen as flourishing and generating growth; in the late 1990s, Zhu Rongji weeded out some of the weaker state-owned enterprises.

However, in some contexts, "guo jin min tui" has been contrasted with "guo jin min ye jin", meaning "the state and the market develop together".

Reforms
In 2008–2012, the government's stimulus package, a response to the global financial crisis, pushed up inflation and increased liquidity; this exacerbated the problem of guo jin min tui. As part of the stimulus, the government continued to prop up individual SOEs whilst letting private enterprises fall by the wayside. There have been calls for this system to be reformed, increasing competition and hence productivity.

External links
 China State Enterprises Advance, Private Sector Retreats
 The Nature, Performance, and Reform of the State-owned Enterprises

References

Economy of China